Fühlinger See is a series of connected lakes in the Cologne suburb of Fühlingen in the German state of North Rhine-Westphalia.

There are equestrian routes around the lake, and the horse riding club Reiterverein Oranjehof is located nearby. Fühlinger See has an international rowing course, and was the venue for the 1998 World Rowing Championships. Men competed in 14 categories for world titles, whilst there were 10 events for women. Germany came out on top of the medal table.

The lake was created from 1912 when aggregate was excavated; according to the German Wikipedia entry, this was for what are now Bundesautobahn 4 (Aachen–Cologne) and Bundesautobahn 3 (Krefeld–Cologne), but according to a newspaper article from 1935, the fill was used for work on the railway line from Aachen to Cologne (which was indeed widened to four tracks from 1912 onwards). With the river Rhine nearby, the excavated hole quickly filled with water. From the 1930s onwards, people came to the lake to swim while excavations were still going on. In 1967, the lakes were officially turned into a recreation area. A total of seven lakes are interconnected, all grouped around a central rowing facility. The various lakes have different purposes: one is for swimming and diving, one for fishing, one for windsurfing, and three for swimming and boating, and one for rowing.

References

Lakes of North Rhine-Westphalia
Rowing venues
Sports venues in Cologne